Nationality words link to articles with information on the nation's poetry or literature (for instance, Irish or France).

Events
March – Ezra Pound leaves America for Europe. In April, he moves to Venice, where in July he self-publishes his first collection of poems, A Lume Spento (dedicated to his friend Philadelphia artist William Brooke Smith, who has just died of tuberculosis). In August he settles in London, where he will remain until 1920 and in December publish A Quinzaine for this Yule.
Summer – The Marlowe Society stages a production at the New Theatre, Cambridge (England), of Milton's masque Comus directed by Rupert Brooke.
Renée Vivien attempts suicide by overdose of laudanum at the Savoy Hotel in London.

The Poets' Club
 Founding in London of the Poets' Club, a group comprised mainly amateurs which met monthly for most of the year.
 Late in the year – T. E. Hulme reads to the Poets' Club his paper, A Lecture on Modern Poetry,  a concise statement of his influential advocacy of free verse.

Works published in English

Canada
 William Wilfred Campbell, Poetical Tragedies including "Mordred", "Daulac", "Morning" and "Hildebrand"
 William Henry Drummond, The Great Fight: Poems and Sketches. New York: G.P. Putnam’s Sons.

United Kingdom
 Lascelles Abercrombie, Interludes and Poems
 Hilaire Belloc, Cautionary Tales for Children
 William Henry Davies, Nature Poems and Others
 Edmund Gosse, The Autumn Garden
 Thomas Hardy, The Dynasts: Part 3 
 Minnie Louise Haskins, The Desert, including the poem The Gate of the Year
 Edith Nesbit, Ballads and Lyrics of Socialism
 Stephen Phillips, New Poems
 Ezra Pound, A Quinzaine for this Yule, American poet published in the United Kingdom
 Katharine Tynan, Experiences, Irish poet published in the United Kingdom
 William Butler Yeats, The Collected Works in Verse and Prose, Irish poet published in the United Kingdom

United States
 William Stanley Braithwaite, The House of Falling Leaves with Other Poems
 Ezra Pound, American poet published in the United Kingdom and Italy:
 A Lume Spento, Pound's first poetry collection (the title translates as "a dim light") published at his own expense in Venice
 A Quinzaine for this Yule, London

Other in English
 John Le Gay Brereton, Sea and Sky, Australia
 Katharine Tynan, Experiences, Irish poet published in the United Kingdom
 Albert D. Watson, The Wing of the Wild-Bird
 William Butler Yeats, The Collected Works in Verse and Prose, Irish poet published in the United Kingdom

Works published in other languages

French language

France
 Francis Jammes:
 Poèmes mesurés
 Rayons de miel, Paris: Bibliothèque de l'Occident
 Valery Larbaud, Les Poésies de A. O. Barnabooth

Canada, in French
 Louis-Joseph Doucet, La Chanson du Passant, French language, Canada
 Albert Ferland, Le Canada Chante, French language, Canada

Other
 C. Subrahamania Bharati, Cutecakitankal, Indian, Tamil-language
 José Santos Chocano, Fiat Lux, Peru
 Louis-Joseph Doucet, Chanson du passant; French language;, Canada
 Albert Ferland, Le Canada chanté, in four volumes, published from this year to 1910, French language, Canada
 Kahlil Gibran, Al-Arwah al-Mutamarrida ("Rebellious Spirits"), Lebanese-born Arabic poet in the United States
 Maria Konopnicka, Rota ("Oath"), Polish

Awards and honors
 Newdigate Prize (University of Oxford) – Julian Huxley, "Holyrood"
 Gaisford Prize for Greek Verse Composition (University of Oxford) – Ronald Knox

Births
Death years link to the corresponding "[year] in poetry" article:
 February 4 – Julian Bell (killed 1937), English poet, and a member of a family whose notable members include his parents, Clive and Vanessa Bell; his aunt, Virginia Woolf; his younger brother, writer Quentin Bell; and writer and painter Angelica Garnett, his half-sister
 March 8 – Ebrahim Al-Arrayedh (إبراهيم العريّض) (died 2002), Indian-born Bahraini poet
 April 2 – Ronald McCuaig (died 1993), Australian poet and writer
 April 15 – Denis Devlin (died 1959), Irish modernist poet and career diplomat
 April 24 – George Oppen (died 1984), American poet, winner of the 1969 Pulitzer Prize in poetry
 May 25 – Theodore Roethke (died 1963), American poet
 June 14 – Kathleen Jessie Raine (died 2003), English poet, critic and scholar
 August 19 – Josephine Jacobsen (died 2003), American poet, short story writer and critic
 September 9 – Cesare Pavese (died 1950), Italian poet, novelist, literary critic and translator
 October 9 – Harry Hooton (died 1961), Australian poet and anarchist
 October 12 – Paul Engle (died 1991), American poet, writer, editor and novelist
 November 28 – Mary Oppen (died 1990), American activist, artist, photographer and writer
 November 30
 Buddhadeb Bosu (died 1974), Bengali poet
 Eric Irvin (died 1992), Australian

Deaths
 January 15 – James Ryder Randall (born 1839), American journalist and poet
 January 16 – Edmund Clarence Stedman (born 1833), American poet, critic, essayist, banker and scientist
 February 22 – Eliza A. Pittsinger (died 1837), American, "The California Poetess"
 May 23 – François Coppée (born 1842), French writer, le poète des humbles
 May 27 – Alexander Posey (born 1873), Native American poet, humorist, journalist and politician
 June 23 – Kunikida Doppo 國木田 獨歩 (born 1871), Japanese Meiji period romantic poet and one of the novelists who pioneered naturalism in Japan
 September 21 – Ernest Fenollosa (born 1853), American orientalist
 October 21 – Charles Eliot Norton (born 1827), American scholar and man of letters

See also

 20th century in poetry
 20th century in literature
 List of years in poetry
 List of years in literature
 French literature of the 20th century
 Silver Age of Russian Poetry
 Young Poland (Młoda Polska) a modernist period in Polish  arts and literature, roughly from 1890 to 1918
 Poetry

Notes

Poetry
20th-century poetry